NGC 7538, near the more famous Bubble Nebula, is located in the constellation Cepheus. It is located about 9,100 light-years from Earth. It is home to the biggest yet discovered protostar which is about 300 times the size of the Solar System. It is located in the Perseus Arm of the Milky Way and is probably part of the Cassiopeia OB2 complex.  It is a region of active star formation including several luminous near-IR and far-IR sources. Stars in NGC 7538 are mainly low-mass pre-main-sequence stars.

References

External links
 

7538
Cepheus (constellation)
Diffuse nebulae
Sharpless objects
Star-forming regions